El Dorado/Captain Jack Thomas Memorial Airport  is a general aviation public use airport located three miles (5 km) southeast of the central business district of El Dorado, in Butler County, Kansas, United States. This airport is publicly owned by the City of El Dorado.

Although most U.S. airports use the same three-letter location identifier for the FAA and IATA, this airport is assigned EQA by the FAA and EDK by the IATA. The airport's ICAO identifier is KEQA. It is included in the Federal Aviation Administration (FAA) National Plan of Integrated Airport Systems for 2017–2021, in which it is categorized as a local general aviation facility.

History

The El Dorado/Captain Jack Thomas Memorial Airport was named after Captain Wilbur Jackson Thomas, a local hero and World War II ace fighter pilot. Thomas flew with the United States Marine Corp VMF-213 Hellhawks from 1943 to 1947. The City of El Dorado, Kansas claims Thomas as its most famous hometown war hero. He received the Navy Cross and the Distinguished Flying Cross during his tour of duty as a marine aviator in the Pacific Fleet of World War II. He is credited with shooting down 18.5 Japanese planes, sharing a kill with another pilot.

The airport was used as a location for the flying movie The Gypsy Moths. Several homes and businesses from the movie can still be seen today.

Services
El Dorado/Captain Jack Thomas Memorial Airport operates 24 hours a day, 7 days a week, including holidays. The fuel pumps are self-service 24 hours a day, and an attendant is available Monday through Friday from 7 am to 3 pm. The airport carries Jet A with prist, 100LL, and Mogas (91 octane) and is available from pumps in front of the terminal. The airport has two multi-storage hangars and 24 individual T-hangars. There are also tie-downs and a single enclosed transient spot for overnight guests. A courtesy car is available 24 hours a day, and there are several nearby motels. Aircraft rental and flight instruction are available on site from Marsh Flying Services. Also on site is Peterson Performance Plus Inc., manufacturer of Kenai and King Katmai aircraft.

Facilities and aircraft

 Runway 4/22: 4,204 x 75 ft (1,281 x 23 m), surface: asphalt
 Runway 15/33: 4,200 x 75 ft (1,280 x 23 m), surface: concrete

For the 12-month period ending November 2, 2017, the airport had 13,225 aircraft operations, an average of 36 per day: 99% general aviation and <1% military. In July 2018, there are 42 aircraft based at this airport: 41 single-engine and 1 ultralight.

References

External links
 from the city of El Dorado website

Airports in Kansas
Buildings and structures in Butler County, Kansas